John Charles Martin (25 July 1903 – 31 December 1976) was an English professional footballer who played as a central defender.

Career
Yorkshire-born Martin crossed the Pennines to begin his career with Lancashire club Burnley in 1923. After failing to break into the Clarets' first team, he joined Accrington Stanley the following year.

The defender made twenty-eight league appearances for Stanley, scoring one goal, before joining Frank Buckley's Blackpool in 1926.

Martin made his debut for the Seasiders on 27 November, in a 2–2 draw with Port Vale at Bloomfield Road. He made two further league appearances in 1926–27, before being released at the end of the season.

He remained in the north-west for the remainder of his career, playing for Southport (two spells), Macclesfield Town, Nelson, Wigan Borough and Oldham Athletic. He retired in 1932, after a nine-year and eight-club playing career.

He is survived by his daughter Irene, born 1925 during his time at Accrington Stanley, two daughters, Diane and Karen, four grandchildren, Andrew, Laura, Matthew and David and six great grandchildren, Siân, Mason, Anderson, Blake, Ada and Thea. His grandsons all followed in his footsteps and were keen amateur footballers in their day. His three great grandsons currently play for local teams in Burnley.

References

1903 births
1976 deaths
Footballers from Leeds
English footballers
Association football defenders
Burnley F.C. players
Accrington Stanley F.C. (1891) players
Blackpool F.C. players
Southport F.C. players
Macclesfield Town F.C. players
Nelson F.C. players
Wigan Borough F.C. players
Oldham Athletic A.F.C. players
English Football League players